The Premios Juventud 2011 were held on July 21, 2011. The nominees were announced on May 16, 2011

Winners and nominees

Special Award "Supernova"

 Antonio Banderas

Mi Artista Urbano 
 Daddy Yankee
Don Omar
 Pitbull
Tito El Bambino
Wisin and Yandel

La Más Pegajosa 
 Bon Bon" by Pitbull
"Heart" Sin Cara "by Prince Royce
 "Danza Kuduro" by Don Omar and Lucenzo
 "The Best of My Life Is You" by Ricky Martin and Natalia Jiménez
 "Loca" by Shakira

Mi Video Favorito 
 "Corazon Sin Cara" by Prince Royce
 "Danza Kuduro" by Don Omar and Lucenzo
 "The Best of My Life Is You" by Ricky Martin and Natalia Jiménez
 "Loca" by Shakira and El Cata
 "Tu Angelito" by Chino y Nacho

Lo Toco Todo 
 "Euphoria" by Enrique Iglesias
 "Foreign First Part" of Dulce María
 "Los Vaqueros" El Regreso "by Wisin y Yandel
 "Music, Soul and Sex" by Ricky Martin
 "Sale El Sol" by Shakira

La Combinación Perfecta 
 Enrique Iglesias and Juan Luis Guerra Cuando Me Enamoro
 Enrique Iglesias and Pitbull "I Like It"
 Ricky Martin and Natalia Jiménez "The Best of My Life is You"
 Enrique Iglesias and Wisin y Yandel "Do not Tell Me Not"
 Jennifer Lopez and Pitbull "On The Floor"

Mi Artista de Rock 
 Alejandra Guzmán
 Juanes
 La Secta All Star
 Mana
 Panda

Mi Artista Tropical 
 Aventura
Juan Luis Guerra
 Marc Anthony
 Olga Tañón
 Prince Royce

Mi Artista Regional Mexicano 
 Alejandro Fernández
 Banda El Recodo
 Espinoza Paz
 Gerardo Ortiz
Jenni Rivera

Mi Artista Pop 
 Camila
Enrique Iglesias
Luis Fonsi
Ricky Martin
Shakira

Qué Rico Que Se Mueve 
 Chayanne
Dulce María
 Pitbull
Ricky Martin
Shakira

Voz del Momento 
 Camila
Espinoza Paz
Gerardo Ortiz
 Prince Royce
Wisin and Yandel

Qué Actorazo 
Antonio Banderas
Gael García Bernal
 Jaime Camil
Javier Bardem
 Kuno Becker

Actriz Que Se Roba La Pantalla 
 Blanca Soto
Jennifer Lopez
Michelle Rodriguez
Salma Hayek
 Zoe Saldaña

Película Más Padre 
"America"
 "Beverly Hills Chihuahua 2
"Beautiful"
 From Prada to Nada
"Machete"

Canción Corta-venas 
 "Aléjate de mi" by Camila
 "Alérgico" of Anahí
 "Bésame" by Camila
 "Heart Without Face" by Prince Royce
 "El" by Jenni Rivera

Chica Que Me Quita El Sueño 
 Belinda
 Blanca Soto
Danna Paola
 Lucero
Maite Perroni

Está Buenísimo 
 Alfonso Herrera
Fernando Colunga
 Guy Ecker
 Julián Gil
William Levy

Mejor Tema Novelero 
 "El" by Jenni Rivera
 "Golondrinas Viajeras" by Lucero and Joan Sebastian
 "Full of Love" by Luis Fonsi
 "Me Enamoré de Ti" by Chayanne
 "Tres Palabras" by Luis Miguel

Deportista de Alto Volage 
Alex Rodriguez
 Carlos Arroyo
 Guillermo Ochoa
 Javier Hernández
 Lionel Messi

La Nueva Promesa del Deporte 
 Al Horford
 Juan Agudelo
 Monica Puig
 Neymar da Silva Santos Jr.
 Yuriorkis Gamboa

Super Tour 

"Stand By Me Tour 2011" Prince Royce

Mi Ringtone  
"Bon Bon" - Pitbull

References

Premios Juventud
Premios Juventud
Premios Juventud
Premios Juventud
Premios Juventud
Premios Juventud
Premios Juventud
2010s in Miami